LeAnn Rimes, released in 1999, is the fourth studio album by LeAnn Rimes.

The album consists of covers of many popular old country hits, including several Patsy Cline songs. The only new song featured on the album is "Big Deal", a bouncy honky-tonk single which details a bitter Rimes telling off a friend who's madly in love with and happily dating Rimes' ex.

The album peaked at #8 on the Billboard 200 and at #1 on the Top Country Albums chart. "Big Deal" peaked at #6 on Billboards Hot Country Singles & Tracks. The album has been certified Platinum for shipments of one million copies in the United States.

Track listing

Personnel 
 LeAnn Rimes – lead vocals, backing vocals (11, 12)
 Randy Fouts – acoustic piano (1, 2, 4-10, 12), keyboards (11)
 Gary Leach – backing vocals (1-10, 12), keyboards (3), organ (12)
 Kelly Glenn – acoustic piano (3)
 Austin Deptula – keyboards (12), backing vocals (12)
 B. James Lowry – electric guitars (1, 2, 4-11), acoustic guitars (1, 2, 4-12)
 Jerry Metheny – electric guitars (3), acoustic guitars (3)
 Marty Walsh – electric guitars (12)
 Milo Deering – steel guitar (1, 2, 4-10, 12), fiddle (4, 9, 10)
 Junior Knight – steel guitar (3)
 Mike Brignardello – bass (1, 2, 4-12), tic-tac bass (1, 2, 4-10)
 Curtis Randall – bass (3)
 Paul Leim – drums (1, 2, 4-12), percussion (8)
 Fred Gleber – drums (3)
 Darrell Holt – vibraphone (1, 4-8)
 Charlie Barnett – percussion (11)
 Carl Albrecht – percussion (12)
 Rita Baloche – backing vocals (1-10, 12)
 Perry Coleman – backing vocals (1, 2, 4-10, 12)
 Annagrey LaBasse – backing vocals (1, 2, 4-10, 12)
 David Pruitt – backing vocals (2)
 John D. Sharp – backing vocals (2)
 John R. Sharp – backing vocals (2)
 Chris Wann – backing vocals (2)
 Matthew Ward – backing vocals (3)
 Debi Lee – backing vocals (12) 

The Nashville String Machine (Tracks 1 & 4-8)
 Kristin Wilkinson – arrangements and contractor
 Darrell Holt – conductor 
 David Angell, Grace Bahng, Denise Baker, David Davidson, Conni Ellisor, Carl Gorodetzky, Gerald Greer, Jim Grosjean, Anthony LaMarchina, Lee Larrison, Bob Mason, Carole Neuer-Rabinowitz, Clara M. Olson, Kathryn Plummer, Pamela Sixfin, Elisabeth Small, Julie Tanner, Alan Umstead, Cathy Umstead, Gary Vanosdale, Mary Kathryn Vanosdale, Kristin Wilkinson and Karen Winklemann – string players

Production 
 Wilbur C. Rimes – producer 
 LeAnn Rimes – co-producer 
 Greg Hunt – chief engineer, mixing 
 Austin Deptula – assistant engineer, digital editing, mastering 
 Gary Leach – assistant engineer 
 Terry Christian – string recording 
 Bob Horn – second string engineer
 Glenn Sweitzer and Fresh Design – art direction, design 
 Andrew Southam – photography 
 George Blodwell – wardrobe stylist 
 Heidi Lee – make-up
 Kohl – hair stylist

Charts
LeAnn Rimes debuted at #8 on Billboard 200 with 115,000 copies sold in its first week.

Weekly charts

Year-end chart

Sales

References

1999 albums
Covers albums
Curb Records albums
LeAnn Rimes albums